Manduadih is a census town in Varanasi tehsil of  Varanasi district in the Indian state of Uttar Pradesh. The census town falls under  the Mhamudpur gram panchayat. Maruadih is about 4 kilometers South-West of  Varanasi railway station, 319  kilometers South-East of Lucknow and 4 kilometers West of Dashashwamedh Ghat.

Demography
Maruadih  has 3284 families with a total population of 14,298. Sex ratio of the census town is 894 and child sex ratio is 818. Uttar Pradesh state average for both ratios is 912 and 902 respectively  .

Transportation
Maruadih  is connected by air (Lal Bahadur Shastri Airport), by train (Manduadih railway station) and by road. Nearest operational airports is Lal Bahadur Shastri Airport and nearest operational railway station is Manduadih railway station (26 and 1 kilometers respectively from Maruadih).

See also
 Varanasi Cantt.
 Varanasi (Lok Sabha constituency)

Notes

  All  demographic data is based on 2011 Census of India.

References 

Census towns in Varanasi district
Cities and towns in Varanasi district